Galleria dell'Accademia or Gallerie dell'Accademia may refer to:

 The Galleria dell'Accademia, an art museum in Florence, Italy
 The Gallerie dell'Accademia, an art museum in Venice, Italy
 The Galleria dell'Accademia di Napoli, an art museum in Naples, Italy 
 The Galleria dell'Accademia di San Luca, an art museum in Rome, Italy